Aldo Fabrizi (born Aldo Fabbrizi; 1 November 1905 – 2 April 1990) was an Italian actor, director, screenwriter and comedian, best known for the role of the heroic priest in Roberto Rossellini's Rome, Open City and as partner of Totò in a number of successful comedies.

Life and career
Born in Rome into a humble family, Fabrizi debuted on stage in a suburban theater in 1931. He soon got local success thanks to his comical sketches and macchiette (i.e. comical monologues caricaturing stock characters), and became a star of the Roman revue and avanspettacolo. He made his film debut during the war, in 1942, and in a short time established himself as one of the most talented actors of the time, spacing from comedy to drama. After a number of successful comedies, in 1945 he played the iconic Don Pietro in the neo-realist drama Rome, Open City, and following the critical and commercial success of the film he had a number of leading roles in other neo-realist films. Already active as a screenwriter, in 1948 he debuted as a director with the drama Immigrants. In the 1950s and 1960s he was often paired on the screen with Totò and with Peppino De Filippo. In 1964 he got a large success on stage with the musical comedy Rugantino, he also toured across Europe, in Latin America and in Broadway.

Like the Italian actor Totò and others, Fabrizi was also initiated to the Scottish Rite Freemasonry.

Personal life
Fabrizi was married to the singer Beatrice Rocchi, best known with her stage name Reginella, until her death in 1981. His sister Elena Fabrizi was also an actress.

Awards and recognition
Fabrizi during his career won two Nastro d'Argento Awards, for best actor for  Alessandro Blasetti's Prima comunione and for best supporting actor in  Ettore Scola's We All Loved Each Other So Much, and a special David di Donatello for his career in 1988. He was also awarded at the 1952 Cannes Film Festival for best screenplay for Cops and Robbers. In 1990 Poste italiane  issued a stamp in his honor.

Actor filmography

        Avanti, c'è posto... (Before the Postman) by  Mario Bonnard (script too )  (1942) as Cesare Montani
	 Campo de' fiori (The Peddler and the Lady) by  Mario Bonnard (script too) (1943) as Peppino Corradini
	 L'ultima carrozzella by  Mario Mattoli (script too)	(1943) as Antonio Urbani, detto "Toto"
	 Circo equestre Za-Bum (episode Dalla finestra and  Il postino) by  Mario Mattoli (1944) as The postman (segments "Dalla finestra" and "Il postino")
	 Roma città aperta by  Roberto Rossellini	(1945) as Don Pietro Pellegrini
	 Mio figlio professore by  Renato Castellani (script too) (1946) as Orazio Belli
 To Live in Peace by  Luigi Zampa (script too )	(1947) as Tigna
        Il vento m'ha cantato una canzone by Camillo Mastrocinque
	 Il delitto di Giovanni Episcopo by  Alberto Lattuada (script too) (1947) as Giovanni Episcopo
        Tombolo, paradiso nero by  Giorgio Ferroni	(1947) as Andrea Rascelli
	 Christmas at Camp 119 by  Pietro Francisci (script too) (1947) as Giuseppe Mancini, il romano
	 Emigrantes by  Aldo Fabrizi	(1948) as Giuseppe Bordoni
	 Benvenuto, reverendo! by  Aldo Fabrizi  (1949) as Don Peppino
	 Francesco, giullare di Dio by  Roberto Rossellini	(1950) as Nicolaio, il tiranno di Viterbo
	 Prima comunione by  Alessandro Blasetti	(1950) as Carlo Carloni
	 Vita da cani by  Steno & Mario Monicelli (script too) (1950) as Nino Martoni
	 Antonio di Padova (Anthony of Padua) by  Pietro Francisci	(1951) as Ezzelino Da Romano
	 Tre passi a Nord (Three steps North) by  William Lee Wilder (1950) as Pietro
	 Rome-Paris-Rome by  Luigi Zampa	(1951) as Vincenzo Nardi
	 Cameriera bella presenza offresi... by  Giorgio Pàstina	(1951) as Il commendatore Giovanni Marchetti
	 Parigi è sempre Parigi by  Luciano Emmer	(1951) as Andrea De Angelis
	 Guardie e ladri by  Steno & Mario Monicelli (script too)	(1951) as Lorenzo Bottoni
	 The Passaguai Family  by  Aldo Fabrizi (1951) as Giuseppe Passaguai
	 Fiorenzo il terzo uomo by  Stefano Canzio (cameo)	(1951) as Guest star
 The Passaguai Family Gets Rich by  Aldo Fabrizi	(1952) as Giuseppe Passaguai
	 Papà diventa mamma by Aldo Fabrizi	(1952) as Sor Pepe 
	 Altri tempi (episode Il carrettino dei libri vecchi) by  Alessandro Blasetti	(1952) as Bookseller
	 Cinque poveri in automobile by  Mario Mattoli (script too)	(1952) as Cesare Baroni
	 Una di quelle by  Aldo Fabrizi	(1953) as Un medico
	 Siamo tutti inquilini by  Mario Mattoli	(1953) as Augusto
	 La voce del silenzio by  Georg Wilhelm Pabst	(1953) as Pio Fabiani
	 Too Young for Love  by  Lionello De Felice	(1953) as Coletti, padre di Annette
        Funniest Show on Earth by Mario Mattoli   (1953) (uncredited)
	 Cafè Chantant by  Camillo Mastrocinque	(1953) as Se stesso / Himself
	 Questa è la vita (episode Marsina stretta) by  Aldo Fabrizi	(1954) as Il Professore Fabio Gori (segment "Marsina stretta")
	 Cento anni d'amore (episode Garibaldina) by  Lionello De Felice	(1954) as Don Pietro, Priest of Monterotondo (segment "Garibaldina")
	 Cose da pazzi by  Georg Wilhelm Pabst	(1954) as Gnauli
	 Carousel of Variety  by  Aldo Quinti & Aldo Bonaldi	(1955)
	 Accadde al penitenziario by  Giorgio Bianchi	(1955)
	 Io piaccio by  Giorgio Bianchi	(1955) as Giuseppe Tassinetti
	 I pappagalli by  Bruno Paolinelli	(1955) as Antonio, the door-keeper
	 Un po' di cielo by  Giorgio Moser	(1955) as Pietro Maltoni
	 The Two Friends by  Carlo Borghesio (script too)	(1955) as Giovanni Bellini
        I pinguini ci guardano by Guido Leoni     (1956) (voice)
	 They Stole a Tram by  Aldo Fabrizi	(1956) as Cesare Mancini
	 Guardia, guardia scelta, brigadiere e maresciallo by  Mauro Bolognini	(1956) as Brigadiere Pietro Spaziani
	 Donatella by  Mario Monicelli	(1956) as Padre di Donatella
        Allow Me, Daddy! by Mario Bonnard     (1956) as Alessandro Biagi - il suocero di Nardi
        Il maestro  by  Aldo Fabrizi (1957) as Giovanni Merino
	 Festa di maggio (Premier mai) by  Luis Saslavsky (1958) as Le vieux camionneur
	 I prepotenti di Mario Amendola (script too)	(1958) as Cesare Pinelli
	 I tartassati by  Steno (script too)	(1959) as Maresciallo Fabio Topponi
	 Ferdinando I re di Napoli by  Gianni Franciolini	(1959) as Il contadino
	 Prepotenti più di prima by  Mario Mattoli (script too)	(1959) as Cesare Pinelli
	 Un militare e mezzo by  Steno (script too)	(1960) as Sgt. Giovanni Rossi
	 La sposa bella (The angel wore red) by  Nunnally Johnson	(1960) as Canon Rota
	 Toto, Fabrizi and the Young People Today by  Mario Mattoli	(1960) as Giuseppe D'Amore
	 Le meraviglie di Aladino by  Mario Bava	(1961) as Sultan
	 Gerarchi si muore by  Giorgio Simonelli	(1961) as Comm. Frioppi
	 Fra' Manisco cerca guai by  Armando William Tamburella	(1961) as Fra Pacifico detto 'Fra Manisco'
	 Gli italiani e le donne (episode Chi la fa, l'aspetti) by  Marino Girolami	(1962)
	 Twist, lolite e vitelloni by  Marino Girolami	(1962) as Cav. Rossi
	 I quattro monaci by  Carlo Ludovico Bragaglia	(1962) as Fra' Giocondo
        The Four Musketeers  by  Carlo Ludovico Bragaglia	(1963) as Bouboule
	 The Shortest Day by  Sergio Corbucci (cameo)	(1963) as Facchino
         The Lightship by  Ladislao Vajda (in Germany)	(1963) as Don Amilcare
	 Totò contro i quattro by  Steno	(1963) as 
	 I quattro tassisti (episode L'uomo in bleu) by Giorgio Bianchi	(1963) as Sor Gigi (segment "L'uomo in blue")
	 Made in Italy by  Nanni Loy	(1965) as Piras, Gaviro's Father (segment "2 'Il Lavoro', episode 2")
	 Sette monaci d'oro by  Marino Girolami	(1966) as Fra' Ugone, padre priore
	 Three Bites of the Apple by  Alvin Ganzer	(1967) as Dr. Manzoni
        Cose di Cosa Nostra (Gang War) by  Steno (script too)	(1971) as Il brigadiere Aldo Panzarani
	 La Tosca by  Luigi Magni	(1973) as Il governatore
	 C'eravamo tanto amati (We All Loved Each Other So Much) by  Ettore Scola	(1974) as Romolo Catenacci
	 I baroni by  Giampaolo Lomi	(1975) as Monsignore
	 Nerone by  Mario Castellacci & Pier Francesco Pingitore	(1977) as Generale Galba
	 Il ginecologo della mutua by  Aristide Massaccesi	(1977) as Pietro Massone
	 Giovanni Senzapensieri by  Marco Colli	(1985) as Gino (final film role)

Film director filmography
 Emigrantes (script too) (1948)
 Benvenuto, reverendo! (producer and script too) (1949)
 The Passaguai Family (producer and script too)  (1951)
 The Passaguai Family Gets Rich (producer and script too) (1952)
 Papà diventa mamma (producer and script too) (1952)
 Una di quelle (producer and script too) (1953)
 Questa è la vita (episode Marsina stretta, script too) (1954)
 Hanno rubato un tram (script too) (1954)
 Il maestro (script too) (1957)

References

External links

 
 Sito amatoriale su Aldo Fabrizi
 La radio di Aldo Fabrizi

Italian male film actors
Italian male stage actors
Italian male comedians
Male actors from Rome
1905 births
1990 deaths
Nastro d'Argento winners
Film directors from Rome
20th-century Italian male actors
David di Donatello Career Award winners
20th-century Italian comedians